The 2003 Voyageurs Cup was the second Voyageurs Cup tournament which was started by the Canadian supporters group The Voyageurs. The 2003 Edition of the tournament featured the same four teams as the 2002 tournament: Calgary Storm, Montreal Impact, Toronto Lynx and Vancouver Whitecaps.

The 2003 competition was won by Montreal Impact who led the competition with wins in their first three games. Neither Toronto Lynx nor Vancouver Whitecaps could overcome their lead, although, Montreal did not clinch their second Voyageurs Cup until the last game of the competition against Calgary, on August 31, with a 2–0 win at home.

Format

Each team played two matches (home and away) against each other team. All of these matches are drawn from the USL A-league's 2003 regular season; the final two matches played between each city's team is counted as a Voyageurs Cup 2003 match.  In each match, 3 points are awarded for wins (even if it comes in extra time), 1 point is awarded for a draw, and 0 points are awarded for losses (even if it comes in extra time).  The four teams are ranked according to the total number of points obtained in all matches.

The team ranked highest after all matches have been played is the champion, and will be awarded the Voyageurs Cup.

Standings

Results by round

Schedule

Champion

Top scorers

References

2003
2003 domestic association football cups
2003 in Canadian soccer